Masai may refer to:
Masai, Johor, a town in Malaysia
Masai Plateau, a plateau in Kolhapur, Maharashtra, India
Maasai people, an ethnic group in East Africa
Maasai language, language of the Maasai ethnic group
Masai (name), Kenyan / African name

See also
Kota Masai, a township in Pasir Gudang, Johor Bahru District, Johor, Malaysia
Masai giraffe (Giraffa camelopardalis tippelskirchi), also known as the Maasai Giraffe or Kilimanjaro Giraffe, the largest subspecies of giraffe and the tallest land mammal
Masai ostrich, subspecies of ostrich
Maasai Mara National Reserve, a large game reserve in Kenya
Massai (c.1847 – 1906 or 1911), an Apache warrior
Masaita, a settlement in Rift Valley Province, Kenya
Maasai (disambiguation) 
Masaichi (disambiguation)

Language and nationality disambiguation pages